Kyz-Zhibek ( Qyz Jybek) is a Kazakh poetic folk legend of the 16th century, tells about the period in the Kazakh nation when the people suffered from bloody feuds. In those times each province of the Kazakh nation had its own Khan and each tried to supersede the other.
The love story of Tolegen, the brave warrior, and the beauty Zhibek ends tragically because of inter-family strife. Tolegen is foully murdered by Bekezhan (the batyr, or nobleman, of the rival family), who earlier strived for the hand of Zhibek. Zhibek commits suicide after learning about the death of Tolegen.

The romantic epic, unfolding at the beginning of the 16th century, when the Kazakh Khanate was first formed from many steppe clans and tribes, was recorded in the 19th century. It was first published in Kazan in 1894 in a version prepared by a Kazakh ethnographer and poet Zhusipbek Shaykhislamuly. Today, sixteen original epic versions are known.

The Kyz-Zhibek poem is included in the world cultural heritage list, 2008 was declared by UNESCO the year of the 500th anniversary of the epic. The anniversary was included in the UNESCO 2008 calendar of significant dates.

Adaptions, translations, editions
In 1934 the opera "Kyz-Zhibek" was staged in Abay Opera House (music - Yevgeny Brusilovsky, libretto -  Gabit Musirepov).

In 1970 Kazakhfilm made a film adaptation based on the legend.

In 1988 the poem was translated into Russian by Kazakh poet Bakhytzhan Kanapyanov.

In 2003, a book was published in the Eposes of the Peoples of Eurasia series, which collected the best versions of the two epics Kozy Korpesh - Bayan Sulu and Kyz-Zhibek.

References

External links

1970 films
Kazakhstani literature
Kazakhstani historical drama films